Tarcea is a commune located in Bihor County, Crișana, Romania. It is composed of three villages: Adoni (Éradony), Galoșpetreu (Gálospetri) and Tarcea. At the 2011 census, it had 2,690 inhabitants, of whom 77% were Hungarians, 16.8% Romanians and 6.1% Roma. 51.7% were Reformed, 20% Roman Catholic, 12.6% Romanian Orthodox, 9.2% Greek-Catholic and 5.2% Baptist.

References

Communes in Bihor County
Localities in Crișana